Leonard Logsdail (born September 11, 1950, in London, England) is a bespoke tailor, based in Manhattan, New York, specializing in men's suits. He is described as one of the finest bespoke tailors in the men's suit business. All of Logsdail's suits are crafted and perfected on-site in his New York City location. He is credited for making Savile Row tailoring a local option in New York. Logsdail is known for creating high-end suits, including lining jackets with Hermes silk scarves. CNBC talk show host, economist and fashion icon Larry Kudlow has his suits made by Leonard Logsdail. Logsdail has created suits for award-winning films, and is recognized as one of cinema's most sought-after tailors. Logsdail has collaborated with esteemed film directors Steven Spielberg, Robert De Niro, Oliver Stone, Ridley Scott, and Martin Scorsese. He has had a cameo acting role as a tailor in The Wolf of Wall Street, Wall Street 2: Money Never Sleeps and The Good Shepherd.

Career
Logsdail left traditional school at the age of 15, and spent 3 years in tailoring school before entering the industry with high aspirations and a passion for men's suits. By the age of 21, Logsdail started his own business. He opened his doors in 1971 on Carnaby Street in London. A few years later, he moved his business to Savile Row. In 1991, Logsdail moved his business from Savile Row to midtown Manhattan New York. His atelier has remained in the same location since 1991, at 9 East 53rd Street, New York, NY.

Personal life 
While his tailoring business was in London, Logsdail made business trips to the United States, where he met his future wife and they married in 1988. They reside in Stamford, Connecticut and have eight children. His son, Leonard, began working with him in 2012.

Costume and Wardrobe in Film and Television

References

Living people
1950 births
Businesspeople from London
British tailors
English emigrants to the United States